The 5th South Carolina Cavalry, also known as "Ferguson's Cavalry Regiment", was Confederate States Army Cavalry regiment in the American Civil War.

Formation and Early Service
The 5th South Carolina Cavalry was formed in January 1863 when several independent cavalry commands were combined. These included the 14th and 17th South Carolina Cavalry Battalions, Capt. Joseph Gist Harlan's Cavalry Company, and Capt. Louis A. Whilden's Cavalry Company (St. James Mounted Riflemen). Lt. Col. Samuel W. Ferguson of the 28th Mississippi Cavalry, then recovering at home in Charleston from an injury received when he fell from his horse, was appointed colonel of the regiment. However, Ferguson's appointment was never confirmed, and he returned to his command in Mississippi without ever joining the regiment.  In his absence, Lieut. Col. Robert J. Jeffords took temporary command of the regiment until John Dunovant, previously dismissed as major of the 1st SC Regulars, was appointed colonel in July 1863. Although officially designated a regiment, the companies remained dispersed at various locations along the South Carolina coast.

Transfer to Virginia
In March 1864 the 5th was ordered to assemble in Virginia, which they completed in April. WIP

See also
List of South Carolina Confederate Civil War units

References

Units and formations of the Confederate States Army from South Carolina
1861 establishments in South Carolina
Military units and formations established in 1861